British Rail departmental wagons are wagons used by British Rail and their successors Railtrack and Network Rail for departmental purposes. Many vehicles are named after aquatic creatures (including fish, mammals, birds and mythical creatures), these names started life as telegraphic codes.

List of Codes

References 

British Rail
British Rail Departmental Units